The Women's National Basketball Association's (WNBA) scoring title is awarded to the player with the highest points per game average in every given season.

See also
 WNBA Peak Performers

External links 
 WNBA Year-by-Year Leaders and Records for Points Per Game by Basketball-Reference.com

Lists of Women's National Basketball Association players
Women's National Basketball Association statistics